Pumacancha (possibly from Quechua puma cougar, puma, kancha enclosure, enclosed place, yard, a frame, or wall that encloses) is a mountain in the Cusco Region in Peru, about  high. It is situated in the Paucartambo Province, Caicay District.

See also 
 Curi

References 

Mountains of Peru
Mountains of Cusco Region